Seletice is a municipality and village in Nymburk District in the Central Bohemian Region of the Czech Republic. It has about 200 inhabitants.

Notable people
František Kordač (1852–1934), Roman Catholic clergyman

References

Villages in Nymburk District